"Vanilla" is a debut single recorded by South Korean girl group Lightsum. It was released by Cube Entertainment on June 6, 2021.

Background and release
On April 15, 2021, Cube Entertainment announced that it would be debuting a new girl group, the first since (G)I-dle in 2018. On May 27, it was announced they would be releasing their debut single "Vanilla" on June 10. Four days later, the promotional schedule was released. On June 4, the audio snippet was released. The music video  teaser was released on June 8 and 9.

Composition
"Vanilla" was written by Jo Yoon-kyung, composed and arranged by Steven Lee, and J. Littlewood alongside Caroline Gustavsson for the composition. It was described as teen pop and dance-pop song with lyrics about "expressing the thrill of tension when starting something new with the sweetness of the moment you fall in love". "Vanilla" was composed in the key of A major with a tempo of 120 beats per minute.

Commercial performance
"Vanilla" debuted at number 12 on South Korea's Gaon Album Chart in the chart issue dated June 6–12, 2021; on the monthly chart, the song debuted at number 28 in the chart issue for June 2021 with 27,897 copies sold. On the Gaon Download Chart, the song debuted at number 59 in the chart issue dated June 6–12, 2021. In United States, the song debuted at number eight on the Billboard World Digital Song Sales in the chart issue dated June 26, 2021.

Promotion
Prior to the release of "Vanilla", Lightsum held an online showcase on the same day to introduce the song and to communicate with their fans. The group subsequently performed on three music programs in the first week: KBS's Music Bank on June 11, MBC's Show! Music Core on June 12, and SBS's Inkigayo on June 13.

Credits and personnel
Credits adapted from Melon.

Studio
 Cube Studio – recording
 Klang Studio – mixing
 821 Sound Mastering – mastering

Personnel
 Lightsum – vocals
 Lightsum (Juhyeon) – background vocals
 Jo Yoon-kyung – lyrics
 Steven Lee – composition, arrangement
 Caroline Gustavsson – composition, background vocals
 J. Littlewood – composition, arrangement
 Choi Ye-ji – recording
 Koo Jong-pil – mixing
 Jung Yu-ra – mixing (assistant)
 Kwon Nam-woo – mastering
 Jang Seung-ho – mastering (assistant)

Charts

Weekly charts

Monthly charts

Sales

Release history

References

2021 singles
2021 songs
2021 debut singles
Korean-language songs
Cube Entertainment singles